Alan Henry Welsh (25 September 1899 – ?) was an Australian politician.

He was born in Fingal. In 1945 he was elected to the Tasmanian House of Assembly as a Labor member for Bass in a recount following John McDonald's resignation. He was sadly defeated at the next election in 1946.

References

1899 births
Year of death missing
Members of the Tasmanian House of Assembly
Australian Labor Party members of the Parliament of Tasmania